Brockton is a city in Plymouth County, Massachusetts, United States; the population was 105,643 at the 2020 United States census. Along with Plymouth, it is one of the two county seats of Plymouth County. It is the sixth-largest city in Massachusetts and is sometimes referred to as the "City of Champions", due to the success of native boxers Rocky Marciano and Marvin Hagler, as well as its successful Brockton High School sports programs. Two villages within it are Montello and Campello, both of which have MBTA Commuter Rail Stations and post offices. Campello is the smallest neighborhood, but also the most populous. Brockton hosts a baseball team, the Brockton Rox.

History

In 1649, Ousamequin (Massasoit) sold the surrounding land, then known as Saughtucket, to Myles Standish as an addition to Duxbury. Brockton was part of this area, which the English renamed Bridgewater.  On June 15, 1821, a portion of the then Bridgewater Township was established as North Bridgewater.  Its name changed in 1874, after a contentious process finally decided on naming it after Isaac Brock (the initial British commanding general at Queenston Heights, where invading American troops suffered a rout, in 1812), after a local merchant heard of Brockville, Ontario, on a trip to Niagara Falls. Brockton became a city on April 9, 1881. During the American Civil War, Brockton was America's largest producer of shoes, and until the latter parts of the 20th century, Brockton had a large shoe and leather products industry.

Since the company's 1898 founding, Brockton has been the headquarters city of office supplies retailer W.B. Mason, itself founded to provide those supplies to the city's shoe industry.

Historical firsts

World firsts
 On October 1, 1883, Brockton became the first place in the world to have a three-wire underground electrical system when Thomas Edison threw a switch to activate it.
 The City Theater opened on October 24, 1894, the first theater in the world to be tied into the three-wire electrical system.

US firsts
 On December 30, 1884, the first electrically operated fire station in the United States opened in Brockton.
 The department store Santa Claus appeared in Brockton in December 1890, when James Edgar, of Edgar's Department Store, suited up for the first time.
 Brockton became the first city in the country to abolish grade crossings in 1896.

World Records
 On November 23, 2010, Brockton set the world record for the most Santa Hat wearers in one place at one time with 872 people participating in the event.
 On November 20, 2011, Brockton doubled the city's Santa Claus hat-wearing record with 1792 people in downtown Brockton wearing Santa hats.

Geography
Brockton is the 162nd largest city by land area in the Commonwealth, and the twelfth largest of the twenty-seven towns in Plymouth County. Brockton is bordered by Stoughton to the northwest, Avon to the north, Holbrook to the northeast, Abington to the northeast, Whitman and East Bridgewater to the southeast, West Bridgewater to the south, and Easton to the west. Brockton is approximately 25 miles south of Boston, and 30 miles northeast of Providence, Rhode Island.

Brockton is mostly an urban setting, lying along the Salisbury Plain River, which once powered the many shoe factories of the city. To the northeast lies the Beaver Brook Conservation Land, attached to the southern end of the Ames Nowell State Park in Abington. There are several parks throughout the city, but the largest is D.W. Field Park, an Olmsted-inspired park which includes ponds, Waldo Lake and Brockton Reservoir in Avon, as well as a golf course.

Climate
According to the Köppen climate classification, Brockton has either a hot-summer humid continental climate (abbreviated Dfa), or a hot-summer humid sub-tropical climate (abbreviated Cfa), depending on the isotherm used.

Demographics

As of the census of 2020, there were 105,673 people, 31,440 households, and about 3.04 people living in each household, and about an average family size of 3.59. The population density was 4,486.3 people per square mile. The racial makeup of the city was 27.3% White, 50.9% African American, 0.7% Native American, 2.0% Asian, 0% Pacific Islander, and 2.2% from two or more races. Hispanic or Latino of any race were 11.9% of the population. The African-American population in Brockton has grown significantly since the beginning of the early 2000s.

Brockton has one of the largest population of Cape Verdean ancestry in the United States, with about 9% of its population. Brockton also reportedly has one of the largest communities of Angolans in the United States. 

Statistically, Brockton is the most populous and most densely populated community in Plymouth County. It is the sixth largest community in the commonwealth. However, it is only the twenty-seventh most densely populated community in the Commonwealth. 

As of 2010, there were 33,675 households, out of which 35.0% had children under the age of 18 living with them, 42.0% were married couples living together, 19.9% had a female householder with no husband present, and 32.4% were non-families. 26.6% of all households were made up of individuals, and 9.5% had someone living alone who was 65 years of age or older. In the city, the population was spread out, with 27.8% under the age of 18, 9.1% from 18 to 24, 30.5% from 25 to 44, 20.8% from 45 to 64, and 11.7% who were 65 years of age or older. The median age was 34 years. For every 100 females, there were 92.1 males. For every 100 females age 18 and over, there were 87.4 males.

As of 2018, the median income for a household in Brockton is $55,140. Males have an average income of $41,093 versus $35,145 for females. The per capita income for the city was $17,163. The poverty rate in Brockton is 15.61% of the population. Notably by race, 23.55% of Hispanics were in poverty, while the Black population of Brockton had about 18.61% of its population living in poverty.

Income

Data is from the 2009–2013 American Community Survey 5-Year Estimates.

Arts and culture

Music
Brockton is home to the Brockton Symphony Orchestra, a community orchestra founded in 1948. The orchestra performs five or six concerts per season at local venues such as Brockton's West Middle School Auditorium and the Oliver Ames Auditorium in the neighboring town of Easton. The orchestra comprises 65 musicians from the greater Brockton area and its musical director since 2007 is James Orent, a guest conductor of the Boston Symphony Orchestra and Boston Pops.

Festivals
 Brockton Summer Concert Series
 Downtown Brockton Arts and Music Festival – End of August annually
 Towerfest – Columbus Day Weekend annually 
 Greek Festival – Third week of September
 Veterans Day Parade annually
 Holiday Parade – Late November annually
 The Cape Verdean Festival – Last Sunday in July

Library
The city supports three buildings within the Brockton Public Library system. The main library is a Carnegie building.

Notable sites
 Brockton Airport – formerly, now the South Side Shopping Center
 Fuller Craft Museum
 Westgate Mall

Sites listed on National Register of Historic Places
 Brockton City Hall
 Brockton Edison Electric Illuminating Company Power Station
 Central Fire Station
 Curtis Building
 Dr. Edgar Everett Dean House
 D.W. Field Park
 Forest Avenue School
 Franklin Block
 Gardner J. Kingman House
 Goldthwaite Block
 Howard Block
 Lyman Block
 Moses Packard House
 Old Post Office Building
 Snow Fountain and Clock
 South Street Historic District

Sports
Based at Campanelli Stadium the Brockton Rox play in the Futures Collegiate Baseball League (FCBL). From 2003 through 2011 the team was a member of the independent professional Can-Am League but in 2012 decided to join the amateur FCBL. Collegiate players on FCBL teams, who are looking for more experience and scouting exposure, are offered non-paid playing opportunities.

Government

On the national level, Brockton is a part of Massachusetts's 8th congressional district, and has been represented since January 2013 by Stephen Lynch.

On the state level, Brockton is represented in three districts in the Massachusetts House of Representatives: the Ninth Plymouth, Tenth Plymouth (which includes West Bridgewater and Precinct 1 of East Bridgewater), and the Eleventh Plymouth (which includes most of Easton). The city is represented in the Massachusetts Senate as a part of the Second Plymouth and Bristol district, which includes Halifax, Hanover, Hanson, Whitman and portions of East Bridgewater and Easton

Brockton has a city government led by a mayor and city council. The city elects a mayor for two-year terms. Previous mayors include Winthrop H. Farwell Jr., John T. Yunits Jr., David Crosby, Carl Pitaro, Richard L. Wainwright, John E. Sullivan, Alvin Jack Sims, Joseph H. Downey and Paul Studenski. James Harrington was elected mayor in 2005 and began his term in January 2006. He was re-elected on November 6, 2007, for another two-year term. He had previously served 16 years as a City Councilor. In the fall of 2009, City Councilor Linda Balzotti defeated Harrington to become the city's first female mayor. Balzotti was defeated in 2013 by Bill Carpenter who won the election by only 44 votes. After the unexpected death of Bill Carpenter on July 3, 2019, City Councillor President Moises Rodrigues become the acting Mayor. On July 15, 2019 Rodrigues was unanimously elected by the 11-person City Council to become the Mayor of Brockton. Rodrigues became the first person of color to become Mayor of Brockton after serving six years on the Brockton city council. In 2009, community activist Jass Stewart was elected to councilor-at-large becoming the first African American to serve in Brockton's city council. The city council consists of four Councilors-at-Large and seven ward Councilors, one for every ward in the city. As of January 2020, the mayor of Brockton is Robert F. Sullivan.

Education

Public schools

Brockton operates its own school system for the city's approximately 17,000 students. There is an early education school (Barrett Russell), ten elementary schools (Angelo, Arnone, Baker, Brookfield, Downey, George, Gilmore, Hancock, John F. Kennedy and Raymond), the Davis K–8 school, six middle/junior high schools (North, East, West, South, Ashfield and the Plouffe Academy), Brockton High School and four alternative schools (Huntington, Edison, Champion and B.B. Russell). Brockton High School's athletics teams are called the Boxers (after the city's undefeated heavyweight boxing champion, Rocky Marciano).

Private schools

Brockton was home to three parochial schools (Sacred Heart, Saint Casimir and Saint Edward) which merged in 2007 to form two schools. Trinity Lower Campus at the former Saint Edwards school site, and Trinity Upper Campus located on the former site of the Saint Colman's school, one Christian school (South Shore Christian and the Brockton Christian School closed in 2010), and Cardinal Spellman High School, a Catholic high school named for Francis Cardinal Spellman, Brockton area native and former Archbishop of New York. Students may also choose to attend tuition-free Southeastern Regional Vocational Technical High School (in South Easton).

Higher education

Brockton is the site of Massasoit Community College and offers Adult Studies/LEAD classes in Brockton. Fisher College also has a campus in Brockton. The Brockton VA Hospital offers classes and apprenticeships to medical students from Fisher College, Harvard University, Boston University, Northeastern University, University of Massachusetts Boston, and Massachusetts College of Pharmacy and Health Sciences. Additionally, the city also has a campus for the National College of Technical Instruction. Porter and Chester Institute also has a campus in Brockton. Brockton is also home to the Brockton Hospital School of Nursing as well as the Monna Bari Medical School.

Infrastructure

Transportation

Major highways
Massachusetts Route 24, a six-lane divided motorway, passes through the west side of the city, with exits at Route 27 to the north and Route 123 to the south. The two routes pass through the center of the city, crossing at that point. Massachusetts Route 28 passes from north to south through the center of the city, The western end of Route 14 (at its intersection with Route 27) and the southern end of Route 37 (at its intersection with Route 28) both are in the city.

Bus
Brockton has its own bus services, operated by the Brockton Area Transit Authority (BAT). Each bus has a designated route running through a section of Brockton, i.e. Montello, Campello, Cary Hill, etc. There are also buses that have routes outside the city, i.e., Bridgewater Industrial Park, Ashmont Station (MBTA subway end-of-line), Stoughton and a connecting bus stop in Montello to the Braintree Station (MBTA subway end-of-line).

Rail
The Middleborough/Lakeville Line of the MBTA's commuter rail system bisects the city running north-south, with stops in the Montello and Campello neighborhoods, as well as in the city center, providing service to points south and South Station in Boston north of the city.

Healthcare

Brockton has three hospitals: Signature Healthcare Brockton Hospital on the east side, Good Samaritan Medical Center—a Steward Family Hospital (formerly Caritas Good Samaritan, and before that Cardinal Cushing) Hospital to the northwest, and the Brockton Veterans Administration Hospital to the southwest. The VA Hospital is the sponsoring institution for the Harvard South Shore Psychiatry program. It serves as a teaching facility for students of various medical specialties from Boston University, physician assistant students from Northeastern University, nursing students from the University of Massachusetts Boston and physician assistant and pharmacy students from the Massachusetts College of Pharmacy and Health Sciences. 

Brockton has a community health center that serves individuals with low income and poor access to health care at Brockton Neighborhood Health Center.

Fire department

The city of Brockton is protected around the clock by 174 paid, professional firefighters of the city of Brockton Fire Department. The Brockton Fire Department currently operates out of six fire stations, located throughout the city, and maintains a fire apparatus fleet of five engines, three ladders, one squad, one tactical rescue unit and several other special, support, and reserve units. The fire department does not provide EMS services; ambulance coverage is handled by Brewster Ambulance.

In 1905, local newspapers recounted many heroic acts by Brockton firefighters during the Grover Shoe Factory disaster. On March 10, 1941, thirteen Brockton firefighters died when the roof collapsed as they were fighting a fire at the Strand Theatre. That fire resulted in one of the worst firefighting tragedies in American history.

Law enforcement
The City of Brockton Police Department has roughly 181 sworn members and 31 non-sworn employees. The officers are assigned to the Patrol Division, and Operations Division which includes; Detectives, Narcotics, Gang Unit, Special Weapons And Tactics, K-9, Quality of Life, GREAT Program, Elderly Affairs, and Community Education Units.  In addition, the city is patrolled by the Fourth (Middleborough) Barracks of Troop D of the Massachusetts State Police.  Brockton also has several citizen anti-crime groups, including the Guardian Angels and Operation Archangel.

Notable people

 Kristian Alfonso, actress
 Jo Baker, singer and songwriter; niece of Mary E. Baker
 Mary E. Baker, first African-American to work at Brockton City Hall; civic leader
 Steve Balboni, professional baseball player
 Ronnie Bardah, professional poker player and Survivor: Island of the Idols contestant
 Darius Bazley, Professional NBA Basketball
 Chris Bender, R&B singer
 Alfred Campanelli, businessman
 Andrew Card, politician
 John Cariani, actor, playwright
 Patrick Condon, author and professor of urban design
 Robert Cottle, television personality
 Jim Corbett, NFL player
 William Damon, psychologist and author
 Al Davis, owned Oakland Raiders
 Charlie DeYoung, Musician founder of rock band The Naughty Bits (1987-1994)
 John Doucette, actor
 Levi Lewis Dorr, American Civil War veteran and physician
 John M. Dowd, lawyer
 Bonnie Dumanis, District Attorney of San Diego County
 James Edgar, first department store Santa
 Shawn Fanning, creator of Napster
 Kenneth Feinberg, attorney
 George Wilton Field, marine biologist
 Keith Gill, stock investor
 Edward Gilmore, first Democrat elected to US Congress from Plymouth County
 Brian Gordon, cartoonist known for Fowl Language
 Scott Gordon, professional hockey player, head coach of New York Islanders
 Noel Gourdin, singer
 Marvin Hagler, professional middleweight boxing champion
 Pooch Hall, actor
 Rudy Harris, professional football player
 Josephine Hasham, women's professional baseball player
 Josh Hennessy, professional hockey player
 George V. Higgins, author
 Pete Hughes, college baseball coach
 George Hurley, musician
 Megan Khang, professional golfer
 Al Louis-Jean, NFL player
 Joe Lauzon, professional MMA fighter
 George N. Leighton, United States court judge
 Jimmy Luxury, musician
 Ken MacAfee, professional football player
 Jim Mann, professional baseball player
 Rocky Marciano, undefeated heavyweight boxing champion
 Bill McGunnigle, inventor of the baseball glove
 Greg McMurtry, professional football player
 Arthur Mercante, boxing referee
 Christy Mihos, entrepreneur, politician
 Ed Nelson, professional basketball player
 Sean Newcomb, professional baseball player
 Leo Paquin, football player at Fordham University
 Goody Petronelli, boxing trainer
 Cory Quirk, professional hockey player
 Jodie Rivera, online personality
 Evelyn Scott, actress
 Robbie Sims, middleweight boxer
 Kevin Stevens, professional hockey player
 Jason Vega, professional football player
 Wyatt Tee Walker, civil rights leader
 Dave Wedge, author, journalist
 Art Whitney, professional baseball player
 Herbert Warren Wind, writer

Awards
Brockton was named one of the 100 Best Communities for Young People in the United States in 2005, 2008, 2010, and 2011 by the America's Promise Alliance.

References

External links

 City of Brockton official website

Brockton, Massachusetts
Cities in Massachusetts
Cities in Plymouth County, Massachusetts
Cape Verdean American history
County seats in Massachusetts
Populated places established in 1700
Eastern Nazarene College locations
1700 establishments in Massachusetts